Fall Lake may refer to:
Fall Lake (Minnesota), a lake in Minnesota
Fall Lake, Minnesota
Fall Lake Township, Minnesota
Fall Lake (New York), a lake in New York